Camden Township is one of the eighteen townships of Lorain County, Ohio, United States. As of the 2010 census, the population was 1,667, of whom 1,424 lived in the unincorporated portions of the township.

Geography
Located in western Lorain County, it borders the following townships:
Henrietta Township - north
New Russia Township - northeast corner
Pittsfield Township - east
Wellington Township - southeast corner
Brighton Township - south
Clarksfield Township, Huron County - southwest
Wakeman Township, Huron County - west

The village of Kipton is located in northern Camden Township.

Name and history
Camden Township was named after Camden, New York, the native home of a land agent. It is the only Camden Township statewide.

Government
The township is governed by a three-member board of trustees, who are elected in November of odd-numbered years to a four-year term beginning on the following January 1. Two are elected in the year after the presidential election and one is elected in the year before it. There is also an elected township fiscal officer, who serves a four-year term beginning on April 1 of the year after the election, which is held in November of the year before the presidential election. Vacancies in the fiscal officership or on the board of trustees are filled by the remaining trustees.

References

External links

County website

Townships in Lorain County, Ohio
Townships in Ohio